Middlebourne is an unincorporated community in Guernsey County, in the U.S. state of Ohio.

History
A post office was established at Middlebourne in 1829, and remained in operation until 1907. The community was so named on account of its relatively central location between Wheeling and Zanesville.

Notable person
 C. Ellis Moore, U.S. Representative from Ohio

References

Unincorporated communities in Guernsey County, Ohio
Unincorporated communities in Ohio